Ljubiša Broćić (3 October 1911 – 16 August 1995) was a Serbian football manager.

Career
Broćić was at the helm of some of the top European sides: PSV Eindhoven, Juventus, FC Barcelona, and Red Star Belgrade. He also was the manager of Al-Nasr in Saudi Arabia, OFK Beograd, Racing Beirut, as well as the Albania, Lebanon, Kuwait's and Bahrain's national teams. With Albania Broćić won the Balkan Cup in its 1946 tournament.

In 1953 the Yugoslav national team was traveling in Brazil, where, according to senior officials in the then Yugoslav Football Association contacted the Chetnik emigrants, why was never allowed to return to Belgrade. The coach did not allow the communist authorities to interfere in his team selection during the World Cup in Brazil and tried to maintain his authority claiming he was defamed for allowing Serbian and Croatian immigrants in Brazil to simply take photos with the national team players.

He also coached Footscray JUST and South Melbourne Hellas in the Victorian State League during the 1960s, and also had stints with the New Zealand national team.

Honours

Manager
Red Star Belgrade
 Yugoslav First League: 1951, 1953
Juventus
 Serie A: 1957–58
Albania
 Balkan Cup: 1946
Al Nassr
 Kings Cup (Saudi Arabia): 1976 
 Saudi Federation Cup: 1976

References

External links

1911 births
1995 deaths
Serbian footballers
Yugoslav footballers
Association football midfielders
SK Jugoslavija players
Yugoslav football managers
Serbian football managers
OFK Beograd managers
Red Star Belgrade managers
Egypt national football team managers
FK Vojvodina managers
Serie A managers
Juventus F.C. managers
La Liga managers
FC Barcelona managers
PSV Eindhoven managers
CD Tenerife managers
New Zealand national football team managers
Albania national football team managers
South Melbourne FC managers
Al Nassr FC managers
Al Hilal SFC managers
Lebanon national football team managers
Racing Club Beirut managers
1972 AFC Asian Cup managers
Lebanese Premier League managers
Kuwait national football team managers
Bahrain national football team managers
Saudi Professional League managers
Eredivisie managers
Yugoslav expatriate football managers
Yugoslav expatriate sportspeople in Albania
Expatriate football managers in Albania
Yugoslav expatriate sportspeople in Egypt
Expatriate football managers in Egypt
Yugoslav expatriate sportspeople in Lebanon
Expatriate football managers in Lebanon
Yugoslav expatriate sportspeople in the Netherlands
Expatriate football managers in the Netherlands
Yugoslav expatriate sportspeople in Italy
Expatriate football managers in Italy
Yugoslav expatriate sportspeople in Spain
Expatriate football managers in Spain
Yugoslav expatriate sportspeople in Kuwait
Expatriate football managers in Kuwait
Yugoslav expatriate sportspeople in New Zealand
Expatriate association football managers in New Zealand
Yugoslav expatriate sportspeople in Australia
Expatriate soccer managers in Australia
Yugoslav expatriate sportspeople in Bahrain
Expatriate football managers in Bahrain
Yugoslav expatriate sportspeople in Saudi Arabia
Expatriate football managers in Saudi Arabia